Simon & Schuster is an American publishing company and a subsidiary of Paramount Global. It was founded in New York City on January 2, 1924 by Richard L. Simon and M. Lincoln Schuster. As of 2016, Simon & Schuster was the third largest publisher in the United States, publishing 2,000 titles annually under 35 different imprints.

History

Early years 
In 1924, Richard Simon's aunt, a crossword puzzle enthusiast, asked whether there was a book of New York World crossword puzzles, which were very popular at the time. After discovering that none had been published, Simon and Max Schuster decided to launch a company to exploit the opportunity. At the time, Simon was a piano salesman and Schuster was editor of an automotive trade magazine. They pooled , equivalent to $ today, to start a company that published crossword puzzles.

The new publishing house used "fad" publishing to publish books that exploited current fads and trends. Simon called this "planned publishing". Instead of signing authors with a planned manuscript, they came up with their own ideas, and then hired writers to carry them out.

In the 1930s, the publisher moved to what has been referred to as "Publisher's Row" on Park Avenue in Manhattan, New York.

Expansion 
In 1939, Simon & Schuster financially backed Robert Fair de Graff to found Pocket Books, America's first paperback publisher. In 1942, Simon & Schuster and Western Printing launched the Little Golden Books series in cooperation with the Artists and Writers Guild.

In 1944, Marshall Field III, owner of the Chicago Sun, purchased Simon & Schuster and Pocket Books. The company was sold back to Simon and Schuster following his death in 1957  for $1 million.

In the 1950s and 1960s, many publishers including Simon & Schuster turned toward educational publishing due to the baby boom market. Pocket Books focused on paperbacks for the educational market instead of textbooks and started the Washington Square Press imprint in 1959. By 1964 it had published over 200 titles and was expected to put out another 400 by the end of that year. Books published under the imprint included classic reprints such as Lorna Doone, Ivanhoe, Tom Sawyer, Huckleberry Finn, and Robinson Crusoe. In 1967, Simon & Schuster acquired Monarch Press Publishing, Inc., along with its extensive line of college and high school study guides published.

In 1960, Richard Simon died of a heart attack; six years later, Max Schuster retired and sold his half of Simon & Schuster to Leon Shimkin. Shimkin then merged Simon & Schuster with Pocket Books under the name of Simon & Schuster. In 1968, editor-in-chief Robert Gottlieb, who worked at Simon & Schuster since 1955 and edited several bestsellers including Joseph Heller's Catch-22, left abruptly to work at competitor Knopf, taking other influential S&S employees, Nina Bourne, and Tony Schulte.

Simon & Schuster was acquired by Gulf+Western in an 8-for-1 stock swap on January 28, 1975. Four years later in 1979, Richard Snyder was named CEO of the company. Over the next several years he would help grow the company substantially.

1980s 
After the death of Gulf+Western head Charles Bluhdorn on February 19, 1983, the company made the decision to diversify. Bluhdorn's successor Martin Davis told The New York Times, "Society was undergoing dramatic changes so that there was a greater need for textbooks, maps, and educational information. We saw the opportunity to diversify into those areas, which are more stable and more profitable than trade publishing."

In 1984, Simon & Schuster with CEO Richard E. Snyder acquired educational publisher Esquire Corporation, owner of companies including Allyn & Bacon (and former owner of Esquire magazine), for $180 million. Prentice Hall was brought into the company fold in 1985 for over $700 million and was viewed by some executives to be a catalyst for change for the company as a whole. This acquisition was followed by Silver Burdett in 1986, mapmaker Gousha in 1987 and Charles E. Simon in 1988. Part of the acquisition included educational publisher Allyn & Bacon which, according to then editor and chief Michael Korda, became the "nucleus of S&S's educational and informational business." Three California educational companies were also purchased between 1988 and 1990—Quercus, Fearon Education and Janus Book Publishers. In all, Simon & Schuster spent more than $1 billion in acquisitions between 1983 and 1991.

In the 1980s, Snyder also made an unsuccessful bid toward video publishing which was believed to have led to the company's success in the audiobook business. Snyder was dismayed to realize that Simon & Schuster did not own the video rights to Jane Fonda's Workout Book, a huge bestseller at the time and that the video company producing the VHS was making more money on the video. This prompted Snyder to ask editors to obtain video rights for every new book. Agents were often reluctant to give these up—which meant the S&S Video division never took off. Simon & Schuster lanuched its audiobook division in 1985. According to Korda,  audiobooks were a major business for Simon & Schuster by the 1990s .

In 1989, Gulf and Western Inc., owner of Simon & Schuster, changed its name to Paramount Communications Inc.

1990s 
In 1990, The New York Times described Simon & Schuster as the largest book publisher in the United States with sales of $1.3 billion the previous year. That same year, Simon & Schuster acquired the children's publisher Green Tiger Press.

In 1993, Simon & Schuster bought Macmillan (including Scribner's, Free Press, and Jossey-Bass), and changed its name to Paramount. Viacom then bought Paramount in 1994 and changed the name back to Simon & Schuster. Macmillan was acquired for US$552.8 million. Later that year, Snyder was suddenly fired from S&S and was replaced by the company's president and chief operating officer Jonathan Newcomb. Simon & Schuster then sold several peripheral assets, such as selling Charles E. Simon Co. to CDB Infotek. Gousha was sold to Rand McNally in 1996.

In 1994, S&S acquired the software operations of Markt+Technik. Later that year, Simon & Schuster (through Paramount) launched a software publisher in partnership with Davidson & Associates named Simon & Schuster Interactive. The studio published video games such as Outlaw Golf, Deer Avenger, I.M. Meen, Chill Manor, EVE Online, and games based on Richard Scarry's characters. S&S Interactive shut down in 2003.

In 1998, Viacom sold Simon & Schuster's educational operations (including Prentice Hall, Macmillan, and Jossey-Bass) to Pearson plc, the global publisher and then owner of Penguin and the Financial Times; Pearson then merged the operations with Addison-Wesley Longman to form Pearson Education. The professional and reference operations were sold to Hicks Muse Tate & Furst.

2000s 
In 2002, Simon & Schuster acquired its Canadian distributor Distican. Simon & Schuster began publishing in Canada in 2013.

At the end of 2005, Viacom split into two companies: CBS Corporation (which inherited S&S and Paramount Parks), and the other retaining the Viacom name. Also in 2005, Simon & Schuster acquired Strebor Books International, which was founded in 1999 by author Kristina Laferne Roberts, who has written under the pseudonym "Zane." A year later, in 2006, Simon & Schuster launched the conservative imprint Threshold Editions.

In 2009, Simon & Schuster signed a multi-book and co-publishing deal with Glenn Beck which fell over many of its imprints and included adult non-fiction, fiction, children, and YA literature as well as e-book and audiobook originals. As part of CBS, Simon & Schuster has been the primary publisher for books related to various media franchises owned by and/or aired on CBS such as CSI. The company has also held a license to publish books in the Star Trek franchise under Pocket Books.

2010s 
In 2011, Simon & Schuster signed a number of co-publishing deals. Glenn Beck signed a new co-publishing deal with Simon & Schuster for his own imprint, Mercury Ink. Under Atria, Simon & Schuster also launched a publishing venture with Cash Money Records called Cash Money Content.

On April 11, 2012, the United States Department of Justice filed United States v. Apple Inc., naming Apple, Simon & Schuster, and four other major publishers as defendants.  The suit alleged that they conspired to fix prices for e-books, and weaken Amazon.com's position in the market, in violation of antitrust law.

Simon & Schuster reorganized all of their imprints under four main groups in 2012. The four groups included the Atria Publishing Group, the Scribner Publishing Group, the Simon & Schuster Publishing Group and the Gallery Publishing Group. According to CEO Carolyn Reidy, the divisions were created to align imprints that complement one another and that the structure would "lead to a sharper editorial focus for our imprints even as it takes consideration of the natural affinities among them." In 2012, Simon & Schuster launched a self-publishing arm of the company, Archway Publishing.

On November 14, 2013, Simon & Schuster signed a co-publishing agreement with former New York Yankees shortstop, Derek Jeter, to launch Jeter Publishing. In December 2013, a federal judge approved a settlement of the antitrust claims, in which Simon & Schuster and the other publishers paid into a fund that provided credits to customers who had overpaid for books due to the price-fixing.

In 2014, Simon & Schuster signed a partnership deal with Amazon over ebooks and also launched a new speculative fiction imprint. On October 21, 2014, Simon & Schuster signed a multi-year partnership deal with Amazon.com in negotiations concerning the price of e-books. Simon & Schuster also launched a new science fiction imprint called Simon451 that would publish titles across science fiction and fantasy with an emphasis on ebooks and online communities. The name of the imprint was inspired by Ray Bradbury's book Fahrenheit 451 (the temperature at which books burn). Bradbury's classic is also published by Simon & Schuster.

Simon & Schuster expanded beyond book publishing in 2015 by offering a new business model and additional services for authors. In 2015, Simon & Schuster announced the creation of a new publishing unit and imprint called North Star Way. The imprint would publish non-fiction titles such as self-improvement, inspirational and mind-body-spirit titles. In addition, the group would also serve as a platform and set of services for authors that go beyond what a traditional book publisher offers to find their audience. The services include helping authors expand their reach through online courses, seminars, workshops, mobile applications, video and audiobooks, sponsorships and business partnerships, and podcasts. North Star Way sits within the Gallery Publishing Group division. According to Michele Martin, publisher and founder, the name North Star reflects their mission, "to publish books that will help readers find the path to a better life, and to be a guide for our authors, not only through publication of their books but also in the many other activities that can help their message find the widest possible audience." In an interview with Kirkus Reviews, Michele Martin expanded that North Star Way, "aims to meet consumers where they are, in whatever form of media they consume. We expand the ideas in the books into a variety of platforms." The name prompted Marvel Comics to attempt to register the name of their superhero Northstar in February 2015. The application was denied as Simon & Schuster had already made a trademark application for North Star Way in January.

Simon & Schuster launched SimonSays.com a portal for online video courses in 2016, along with Scout Press, a new literary fiction imprint under Gallery Books Group. They also launched North Star Way, a platform-based program to provide authors with services beyond publishing including brand management, online courses, sponsorship, and business partnerships. Also as of 2016, Simon & Schuster had more than 18k e-books available for sale and signed a deal to distribute Start Publishing LLC, a catalog of 7,000 e-book titles.

In 2019, CBS and Viacom reunited to form ViacomCBS. As a result, Simon & Schuster became part of the newly formed ViacomCBS. Since February 15, 2022, ViacomCBS is known as Paramount Global.

2020s 
In March 2020, ViacomCBS CEO Bob Bakish announced the company's intention to sell the Simon & Schuster division, as it "does not have significant connection for our broader business." Bakish expected a sale to close in 2020, although the COVID-19 pandemic delayed that process.

In September 2020, German media group Bertelsmann (which owns Penguin Random House) announced that it was interested in acquiring Simon & Schuster. According to Bertelsmann chief executive and chairman Thomas Rabe, "We've been the most active player on the consolidation of the book publishing market in the last 10 years. We combined Penguin and Random House very successfully to create by far the largest book publisher in the world, actually the only global book publisher. Given this position we would, of course, be interested in Simon & Schuster."

Vivendi (which owns French publisher Editis) and News Corp (which owns HarperCollins) were also named as contenders in acquiring Simon & Schuster. ViacomCBS expected the bids to be placed before Thanksgiving 2020 (November 26).

On November 25, 2020, ViacomCBS announced it would sell Simon & Schuster to Bertelsmann subsidiary Penguin Random House for $2.175 billion. The deal had been expected to close in 2022. The deal, however, was blocked by US federal judge Florence Y. Pan on October 31, 2022. An appealing to the court ruling was announced a day later by Bertelsmann, but it was ultimately canceled on November 21.

In 2021, Simon & Schuster made book deals with former Trump administration officials, such as Vice President Mike Pence and Trump adviser Kellyanne Conway. This prompted protests among Simon & Schuster staff. On November 2, 2021, the United States Department of Justice filed a civil antitrust lawsuit to block Penguin Random House's proposed acquisition of Simon & Schuster. The lawsuit argues that the acquisition would create a publisher with too much influence over books and author payments. A federal judge sided with the plaintiff, leading Paramount to nullify the deal in November 2022.

In 2022, Simon & Schuster employee Filippo Bernardini was arrested for the 2016–2021 literary phishing thefts. The company released a statement saying they were "shocked and horrified to learn today of the allegations of fraud and identity theft by an employee.”

People

Editors and publishers 
 Clifton Fadiman Jr., editor-in-chief
 Jack Goodman, editor-in-chief
 Jerome Weidman, editor-in-chief
 Joe Barnes, editor-in-chief
 Justin Kaplan
 Max Schuster (editor-in-chief)
 Michael Korda (editor-in-chief)
 Quincy Howe (editor-in-chief)
 Robert Gottlieb
 Peter Schwed
 Wallace Brockway (editor-in-chief)
 William Cole
Maxwell Perkins

Authors 
Simon & Schuster has published thousands of books from thousands of authors. This list represents some of the more notable authors (those who are culturally significant or have had several bestsellers, meaning they have sold at least 3,000 books).

 Andrew Solomon
 Annie Proulx
 Audrey Niffenegger
 Bob Woodward
 Carrie Fisher
 Chapo Trap House
 Cornelius Ryan
 Dan Brown
 David McCullough
 Dick Cheney
 Donald Trump
 Doris Kearns Goodwin
 Doris Lessing
 Ernest Hemingway
 F. Scott Fitzgerald
 Frank McCourt
 Glenn Beck
 Kayleigh McEnany
 Ludwig Bemelmans
 Harold Robbins
 Hendrik Willem van Loon
 Hillary Clinton
 Howard Stern
 Hunter S. Thompson
 Jack Paar
 Jackie Collins
 James Riley
 Janet Evanovich
 Jimmy Carter
 Jodi Picoult
 John Bolton
 John Irving
 Joseph Heller
 Jennette McCurdy
 Judith Rossner
 Kay Thompson
 Larry McMurtry
 Lana Del Rey
 Maddox
 Mark R. Levin
 Mary Higgins Clark
 P. G. Wodehouse
 Peter Hook
 Philippa Gregory
 R. L. Stine
 Sandra Brown
 Shel Silverstein
 Siddhartha Mukherjee
 Sister Souljah
 Stephen E. Ambrose 
 Stephen King
 Thomas Berger
 Thomas Wolfe
 Ursula K. Le Guin
 Walter Isaacson
 Zoella

Logo 

According to one source, The Sower, the logo of Simon & Schuster, was inspired by the 1850 Jean-François Millet painting of the same name. According to Michael Korda, the colophon is a small reproduction of The Sower by Sir John Everett Millais.

Imprints

Adult publishing 
 Adams Media, located in Avon, Massachusetts
 Atria Publishing Group
 37 INK, publisher of African-American and other diverse voices
 Atria Books, general publisher
 Atria Español, publisher of Spanish language books with a focus on United States Spanish speakers
 Atria Unbound, general publisher of ebook editions of Atria 
 Beyond Words Publishing co-venture with Atria specializing in the mind-body-spirit category
 Cash Money Content, a co-venture with Cash Money Records 
 Emily Bestler Books, publisher of fiction and non-fiction
 Enliven Books, publisher of spiritual and wellness books
 Howard Books, publisher of Christian books
 Keywords Press, publisher of books by Internet personalities
 Marble Arch Press, co-publishing agreement with the United Kingdom publisher Short Books
 One Signal Publishers, nonfiction publisher founded by Julia Cheiffetz
 Simon Element, publishes nonfiction books addressing foundational topics.
 Strebor Books International, publisher of African-American books as well as Black Erotica 
 Washington Square Press, paperback publisher of classic and contemporary fiction
 Avid Reader Press
 Gallery Books Group
 Gallery Books, general interest publisher 
 Karen Hunter Publishing, general interest imprint founded by journalist Karen Hunter 
 Mercury Ink, co-publishing deal with Glenn Beck and Mercury Radio Arts
 MTV Entertainment Books (formerly MTV Books), young adult and pop-culture imprint
 North Star Way Books, inspirational non-fiction imprint with additional services for authors
 Pocket Books, mass market imprint of the Gallery Publishing Group
 Pocket Star, e-book only imprint of the Gallery Publishing Group
 Scout Press, publisher of literary fiction
 Threshold Editions, conservative imprint 
 Twelve, an imprint that publishes each book with a month-long launch
 Gallery 13, a graphic novel imprint
 Scribner 
 Scribner, publisher of fiction and non-fiction books
 Simon & Schuster (the flagship imprint)
 Folger Shakespeare Library, publishes print and ebooks of Shakespeare works 
 Simon451, publisher of speculative fiction and fantasy
 Saga Press (specializes in science fiction and fantasy.)

Children's publishing 
 Aladdin, publisher of picture and chapter books for middle-grade readers
 Atheneum, publisher of literary middle grade, teen and picture books
 Beach Lane Books, publisher of picture books, founded in 2008 and located in San Diego
 Little Simon, publisher of children's books
 Margaret K. McElderry Books, boutique imprint publisher of literary fiction and nonfiction for children and teens
 MTV Books, pop culture imprint relaunched in 2021
 Paula Wiseman Books, publisher of picture books, novelty books and novels for children
 Salaam Reads, imprint for Muslim children's literature by Simon & Schuster's Children's Division
 Simon & Schuster Books for Young Readers, flagship imprint of Simon & Schuster's Children's Division
 Simon Pulse, publisher of teen books, launched in 1999 as Pocket Pulse and renamed in 2001
 Simon Spotlight, publisher focused on licensed properties for children

Audio 
 Pimsleur Language Programs, language courses
 Simon & Schuster Audio, Audio division of Simon & Schuster

Former imprints 
 Archway (children's imprint of Pocket Books, merged into Aladdin Paperbacks)
 Bookthrift (Inexpensive reprints, discontinued)
 Earthlight (UK science fiction imprint, discontinued) 
 Downtown Press (women's fiction, discontinued)
 Fireside Books
 Free Press
 Green Tiger Press
 Half Moon Books
 Inner Sanctum Mysteries
 Linden Press
 Long Shadow Books
 Minstrel Books (children's imprint of Pocket Books, merged into Aladdin Paperbacks)
 Poseidon Press (operated 1982–1993)
 Richard Gallen Books
 Simon & Schuster Interactive (1995–2003)
 Sonnet Books
 Summit Books, run by James H. Silberman (operated 1976–1991)
 Tiller Press (specializes in "practical nonfiction": diet, wellness, home design.)
 Touchstone 
 Wallaby Books

See also 

 The other "Big Five" English language book publishers: Hachette, Holtzbrinck/Macmillan, HarperCollins and Penguin Random House
 Books in the United States
 List of largest book publishers of the United Kingdom
 Media of New York City

References

Further reading 
 
 "Simon & Schuster Inc." International Directory of Company Histories. 4:671–672.
 "Simon & Schuster Inc." International Directory of Company Histories. 19:403–405.

External links 
 

 
Book publishing companies based in New York (state)
Publishing companies based in New York City
American companies established in 1924
Publishing companies established in 1924
1924 establishments in New York (state)
Paramount Global subsidiaries
Gulf and Western Industries